Appalachian Regional Airport  is a public use airport located eight nautical miles (9 mi, 15 km) east of the central business district of Williamson, a city in Mingo County, West Virginia, United States. It is owned by the Mingo County Airport Authority. The airport was built on a reclaimed mine site near Varney, West Virginia, and opened in 2012.

This airport is included in the National Plan of Integrated Airport Systems for 2011–2015, which categorized it as a general aviation facility. Although most U.S. airports use the same three-letter location identifier for the FAA and IATA, this airport is assigned EBD by the FAA, but has no designation from the IATA (which assigned EBD to El Obeid Airport in El Obeid, Sudan).

Facilities and aircraft 
Appalachian Regional Airport covers an area of 400 acres (162 ha) at an elevation of 1,883 feet (574 m) above mean sea level. It has one runway designated 8/26 with an asphalt surface measuring 5,001 by 75 feet (1,524 x 23 m).

For the 12-month period ending June 30, 2012, the airport had 200 general aviation aircraft operations, an average of 16 per month.

See also 
 Mingo County Airport , located at

References

External links 

 
 

Airports in West Virginia
Transportation in Mingo County, West Virginia